Dru Drury (4 February 1724 – 15 December 1803) was a British collector of natural history specimens and an entomologist. He had specimens collected from across the world through a network of ship's officers and collectors including Henry Smeathman. His collections were utilized by many entomologists of his time to describe and name new species and is best known for his book Illustrations of natural history which includes the names and descriptions of many insects, published in parts from 1770 to 1782 with copperplate engravings by Moses Harris.

Life 
Dru Drury was born in Lad Lane, Wood Street, London where his father, also Dru [also given as "Drew"] Drury (1688–1763), was a citizen, goldsmith and silversmith of the City of London, and his second wife Mary, daughter of Dr Hesketh, chaplain to Queen Anne. The elder Dru Drury's grandfather, William, Lord of the Manor of Colne (Drurys manor, to the east of the old church at Colne, was demolished c. 1787), Huntingdonshire (now Cambridgeshire), was Sheriff of Cambridgeshire in 1676. The Drury (later Dru Drury, the forename being given to all subsequent generations as part of a compound surname) family traced back to a Thomas Drury, of Fincham, Norfolk, who died in 1545. Descendants of Dru Drury retained the status of Citizen and goldsmith of the City of London until at least 1969.

Drury apprenticed to his father in the Goldsmith's Company in 1739 and became a liveryman in 1751. In 1748 he married Esther, the daughter of his father's fourth wife from an earlier marriage to soapmaker John Pedley of London. Drury then inherited his father's business as well as became owner to several freehold houses in London and Essex. By 1771 he was earning nearly £2000 a year and had amassed enough wealth to buy the entire stock of a fellow silversmith, Nathaniel Jeffreys, on 32 Strand Street. He earned nearly £2000 per year but he was cheated by two Yorkshire cutlers (William Tate and John Wheate) leading to bankruptcy in 1777. Assisted by Sir Joseph Banks, John Fothergill, and other friends, he resumed business but retired in 1789 to devote all his time to entomology. Drury and his wife had three children, Mary, born 1749; William (who became a silversmith) born 1752; and Dru, born 1767. He spent his retirement between London and Broxbourne, Hertfordshire where he collected insect specimens. Around 1797 the family moved to Turnham Green but Drury began to face ill health starting with stones in his bladder. Other complications followed and he died in the home of his son in the Strand on 15 January 1804. He was buried at St. Martin-in-the-Fields on 21 January.

Natural history career
Drury was keenly interested in entomology even before retiring as a silversmith and was the president of the Society of Entomologists of London from 1780 to 1782. He was also a member of the Linnean Society. Beginning in 1770, Drury corresponded with a number of entomologists from all over the world from India to Jamaica and America. He offered 6 dimes for any insect of any size from officers of merchant ships travelling afar. He also had a three-page pamphlet on instructions for collecting. It is through these connections that Drury received much of his collection. (26) To Mr. Keuchan, at Jamaica. June 13, 1774.You inquire after Mr. Smeathman, who is settled on the Coast of Africa. He, has been there almost three years but has sent nothing over except insects, a circumstance which astonishes us, for his patrons expected a great variety of subjects long before this in ye different branches of Natural History. Many of the insects that he has sent are surprisingly fine. A great number entirely new, especially among, the Coleoptera, some of which are very large. --From a collection of letters published in The Scientific Monthly.From 1770 to 1787, he published the three-part Illustrations of Natural History, Wherein are Exhibited Upwards of 240 Figures of Exotic Insects, with copperplates by Moses Harris. This was later revised and republished under the title Illustrations of Exotic Entomology in 1837. Drury's work was self-published and many of his correspondences with various workmen in the publishing industry have survived. In the letters, detailed accounts of prices and publishing techniques are provided which shed light on Britain's early printing industry.

One of Drury's special hunt was for a specimen of the Goliath beetle. A specimen had been obtained by William Hunter and was lent to Emanuel Mendes da Costa. Da Costa had drawings of the beetle made by Moses Harris but before it could be published he was embroiled in an embezzlement scandal in the Royal Society which led to a prison term. The drawing however was bought by Drury and it went into Drury's book with Westwood's name of Goliathus druryi. Hunter was understandably angry with what he saw as "theft" and Drury subsequently made a special search for another specimen of the beetle. A specimen was sent by Henry Smeathman but Drury misidentified it. Drury was also interested in rocks and minerals and took a special interest in the distribution of gold around the world. He also took an interest in gardening, angling in the River Lea, and in making his own wines.

Drury's collection comprised over 11,000 specimens. Many species were described and given their binomial names by contemporary entomologists like J.C. Fabricius, Ernest Olivier, and Kirby:

After his death, the collections were sold in a three-day auction by King and Lochee and earned £614 8s. 6d. with an additional £300 for his cabinets and books. A catalogue of the collections was published. Unfortunately, Drury's collections, while large, lacked substantial location and other data (as it was not customary at the time). Thus, it is difficult, if not impossible, for any sound scientific data to be formed in regards to the history of its specimens.

References

Other sources
Evenhuis, N.L. 1997. Litteratura Taxonomica Dipterorum. Leiden: Backhuys Publishers. 209–212
Gilbert, P. 2000: Butterfly Collectors and Painters. Four Centuries of Colour Plates from the Library Collections of the Natural History Museum, London. Singapore, Beaumont Publishing Pte Ltd : X+166 S. 27–28, Portr., 88–89, 140–141, 148–149: Lep.Tafel

Osborn, H. 1952: A Brief History of Entomology Including Time of Demosthenes and Aristotle to Modern Times with over Five Hundred Portraits Columbus, Ohio, The Spahr & Glenn Company : 1–303.
Salmon, M. A. 2000 The Aurelian Legacy. British Butterflies and their Collectors. – Martins, Great Horkesley : Harley Books : 1–432

External links

Zoologica Göttingen State and University Library
Illustrations of natural history
Illustrations of Exotic Entomology
Entry in the Dictionary of National Biography
Dru Drury manuscripts at the NHM (London) archives

1724 births
1803 deaths
Entomologists from London
English silversmiths
English lepidopterists
People from the City of London